PT Bank Danamon Indonesia Tbk is an Indonesian bank established in 1956. It is the sixth largest bank of Indonesia by asset size.

History
Bank Danamon was established on July 16, 1956, as PT Bank Kopra Indonesia. In 1976, the bank's name was changed to PT Bank Danamon Indonesia. It began focusing on foreign exchange transactions in 1976 and listed its shares on the Jakarta Stock Exchange in 1989.

Suffering liquidity problems amid the Asian financial crisis, Danamon was in 1997 placed by the government under the supervision of the Indonesian Bank Restructuring Agency (IBRA). In 1999, the government through IBRA, recapitalized Danamon with Rp 32 billion in Government Bonds. In the same year, some banks taken over by the government merged with Bank Danamon as one part of IBRA's restructuring plan.

In 2000, Bank Danamon merged with another eight banks taken over by the government, further increasing Danamon's size.

Over the next three years, Danamon underwent a massive restructuring, which covered management, human resources, organization, information systems, statutes and company logos. These changes sought to boost the bank's growth, transparency and professionalism.

In 2003, a consortium of Asia Finance Indonesia, under the control of Singapore's Temasek Holdings, bought a majority stake in Danamon. The new management sought to further improve Danamon's performance and position.

In 2008, Danamon adopted the slogan "Untuk Anda, Bisa" ("For You, Can").

In July 2017, Danamon adopted the slogan "Saatnya Pegang Kendali" ("It's Time to Take Control").

In December 2017, Japan's Mitsubishi UFJ Financial Group (MUFG) bought a 19.9% stake in Danamon from Temasek Holdings for Rp 15.875 trillion ($1.17 billion). The price indicated Danamon was valued at about $6 billion. In July 2018, Indonesia's Financial Services Authority (OJK) approved MUFG's plan to purchase a further 20.1% stake from Asia Financial. In April 2019, MUFG announced the merger of Danamon and Bank Nusantara Parahyangan (BNP). The merger resulted in MUFG becoming the majority shareholders with 94.1% stake of Bank Danamon.

In December 2019, Danamon sold most of its share of Adira Insurance to Zurich Insurance Company, making Danamon a minority shareholder.

Subsidiaries
 PT Adira Dinamika Multi Finance Tbk (Adira Finance)
 PT Adira Quantum Multifinance (Adira Kredit)

References

Works cited
 Serikat Pekerja Danamon

External links
 
Official labor union website
 Profil Wirausaha Sukses
 Wirausaha Sukses
 Wirausaha Sosial
 Tokoh Inspirasi Indonesia
 Jajaran Direksi
 Download Logo Dana here

1956 establishments in Indonesia
1980s initial public offerings
Banks of Indonesia
Companies listed on the Indonesia Stock Exchange
Mitsubishi UFJ Financial Group
Banks established in 1956
Companies based in Jakarta